Thalita Vitória Simplício da Silva (born 20 August 1997) is a Brazilian Paralympic athlete who competes in sprinting and long jump events at international elite events. She is a Paralympic silver medalist, a double Parapan American Games silver medalist and a World champion in sprinting.

Simplício was born with impaired vision and went completely blind aged twelve.

She was one of the first dozen Brazilian paralympians cleared to compete at the Tokyo Olympics postponed to 2021. Other early choices to be included were Jerusa Geber Dos Santos (who also competes in T11), Rayane Soares (T13), Beth Gomes (F52), Claudiney Batista (F56), Cícero Valdiran (F57) and Thiago Paulino.

References

External links
 

1997 births
Living people
Brazilian female sprinters
Brazilian female long jumpers
Paralympic athletes of Brazil
Athletes (track and field) at the 2016 Summer Paralympics
Athletes (track and field) at the 2020 Summer Paralympics
Medalists at the 2016 Summer Paralympics
Medalists at the 2020 Summer Paralympics
Paralympic silver medalists for Brazil
Medalists at the World Para Athletics Championships
World Para Athletics Championships winners
21st-century Brazilian women